Pradeep Kumar Jain Aditya (born 8 September 1962), is an Indian politician from Indian National Congress (INC), who was Minister of State in Ministry of Rural Development in the 2009 Union Cabinet.

He was elected as a Member of Parliament in 2009 Indian general election and had represented the Jhansi constituency in 15th Lok Sabha.

Early life and education
He was born on 8 September 1962 in Jhansi, Uttar Pradesh to Vishnu Kumar Jain and Shanti Devi Jain.

His educational qualifications include degrees of M.A., M.Com., and L.L.B. from Bundelkhand University. He is an advocate by profession.

Career

Pradeep was elected as a member of Uttar Pradesh Vidhan Sabha from Jhansi constituency in 2007. In 2009, he was elected to 15th Lok Sabha from Jhansi in the Indian general election of 2009 and thereafter became Union Minister of State, for Rural Development, and his inclusion in the ministry was seen as an indication of renewed importance given to Bundelkhand politics by the Congress party.

Pradeep is credited with installing statue of hockey legend from Jhansi, Dhyan Chand in the city. Pradeep wrote the letter with signatures of 81 MP's to  then PM on 21 December 2011 for considering Bharat Ratna for Dhyan Chand. However Sachin Tendulkar and C.N. Rao were selected for the award.

Pradeep Jain contested Jhansi lok sabha seat in 2014 Indian general election but lost the seat to Uma Bharti of the BJP.

Personal life
On 5 May 1992, he married Snehalata Jain and the couple have two children, a son and a daughter.

References

External links
 
 Pradeep Jain aditya, website
 Pradeep Kumar Jain  Aditya, Official webpage at Lok Sabha website.

Indian National Congress politicians from Uttar Pradesh
1968 births
Living people
Politicians from Jhansi
21st-century Indian Jains
Uttar Pradesh MLAs 2002–2007
India MPs 2009–2014
Union ministers of state of India
Uttar Pradesh MLAs 2007–2012
Lok Sabha members from Uttar Pradesh
United Progressive Alliance candidates in the 2014 Indian general election